The 2011 Men's Pan American Challenge was the first edition of the Men's Pan American Challenge. It was held between 31 July and 7 August 2011 in Rio de Janeiro, Brazil, simultaneously with the women's tournament.

Three teams competed in a double round-robin tournament. Uruguay won the tournament for the first time, finishing top of the pool above Brazil and Paraguay who won silver and bronze respectively.

Participating nations
A total of three teams competed for the title:

 (host nation)

Results

Pool

Final standings

References

Pan American Challenge
Pan American Challenge Men
Men's Pan American Challenge
International field hockey competitions hosted by Brazil
Pan American Challenge Men
Pan American Challenge Men
International sports competitions in Rio de Janeiro (city)
2010s in Rio de Janeiro